Peter Stead (born 22 September 1930, in Yorkshire, England) is a retired Canadian cricketer. He was a right-handed batsman and a right-arm fast-medium bowler. He played three first-class matches for Canada on their 1954 tour of England, in which he took nine wickets at an average of 19.66.

References
Cricket Archive profile
Cricinfo profile

1930 births
Living people
Canadian cricketers
Cricketers from Leeds
English emigrants to Canada